Tinjacá is a town and municipality in Boyacá Department, Colombia, part of the subregion of the Ricaurte Province. It borders Sutamarchán in the north, Ráquira in the south, Sáchica in the east and in the west Chiquinquirá and Saboyá.

Etymology 
Tinjacá is derived from Chibcha and means "Enclosure of the powerful lord".

History 
The area of Tinjacá before the Spanish conquest was part of the Muisca Confederation, a loose confederation of different Muisca rulers. The cacique of Tinjacá was loyal to the zaque of Hunza. Modern Tinjacá was founded on November 7, 1555.

Economy 
Main economical activities of Tinjacá are agriculture and livestock farming. Important agricultural products are onions, tomatoes, peaches, potatoes, maize and peas.

Gallery

References 

Municipalities of Boyacá Department
1555 establishments in the Spanish Empire
Populated places established in 1555
Muisca Confederation
Muysccubun